Adjungbilly Shire was a local government area in the Riverina region of New South Wales, Australia.

Adjungbilly Shire was proclaimed on 7 March 1906. In 1910, the Shire was granted the powers of a municipality in respect to the South Gundagai urban area.

The shire was amalgamated with the  Municipality of Gundagai to form Gundagai Shire on 1 January 1924.

References

Former local government areas of New South Wales
1906 establishments in Australia
1924 disestablishments in Australia